Amritsar North Assembly constituency (Sl. No.: 15) is a Punjab Legislative Assembly constituency in Amritsar district, Punjab state, India. Its Member of Legislative Assembly is Kunwar Vijay Pratap Singh, Aam Aadmi Party.

Members of the Legislative Assembly

Election results

2022

2017

Prev. Results

References

External links
  

Assembly constituencies of Punjab, India
Amritsar district